The  flag of Sardinia, called the flag of the Four Moors or simply the Four Moors (and Is cuatru morus), represents and symbolizes the island of Sardinia (Italy) and its people. It was also the historical flag and coat of arms of the Aragonese, then Spanish, and later Savoyard Kingdom of Sardinia. It was first officially adopted by the autonomous region in 1950 with a revision in 1999, describing it as a "white field with a red cross and a bandaged Moor's head facing away from the hoist (the edge close to the mast) in each quarter" (Regional Law 15 April 1999, n. 10, Art. 1).

The flag is composed of the St George's Cross and four heads of Moors, which in the past may not have been forehead bandaged but blindfolded and turned towards the hoist. But already well-preserved pictures from the 16th century clearly show a forehead bandage (see gallery below). The most accepted hypothesis is that the heads represented the heads of Moorish princes defeated by the Aragonese, as for the first time they appeared in the 13th-century seals of the Crown of Aragon – although with a beard and no bandage, contrary to the Moors of the Sardinian flag, which appeared for the first time in a manuscript of the second half of the 14th century.

History

The oldest certified heraldic symbol of the cross of Saint George with four Moors in each quarter, known as the Cross of Alcoraz, dates back to 1281 and was used by the Royal Chancellery of Peter III of Aragon as the king's coat of arms upon seals. In the 13th century the Moors' heads had no head bandages and were bearded; the coat of arms of Sardinia never appeared in such a way.

After the kingdom of Sardinia was founded in 1326, it became part of the Crown of Aragon; 

The Four Moors begin to be used consistently as a symbol of the Kingdom of Sardinia during the time of the Catholic Monarchs, and especially from the time of the Emperor Charles V. In Sardinia, the first safe attestation of the coat of arms is on the cover of the Acts of the military arm of the Sardinian Parliament, the Capitols de Cort del Stament Militar de Serdenya printed in Cagliari in 1591. Throughout the period of the Iberian monarchies, the original design of the bandages on his forehead was respected.

The design with blindfolded Moors facing the left first appeared in 1800, after Sardinia passed to the House of Savoy. It was either due to a mistake of a copyist or, similarly to the flag of Corsica during the earlier period of French rule, a deliberate protest against the mainland rulers. It became the official flag of the region under a decree of 5 July 1952. In 1999, a special regional law changed the flag from the version adopted under Savoy rule to the original one.

Legendary origin

There are separate Spanish and Sardinian traditions to explain the origin of the flag and there is no consensus among scholars as to which is correct. According to the Spanish tradition, it was a creation of King Peter I of Aragon, celebrating his victory at the Battle of Alcoraz in 1096. It was said that St. George miraculously appeared on the field of battle and that there were four severed heads of Saracen kings at the end; thus the red cross and white background of the St George's Cross and the heads of four Moors. The Sardinian-Pisan tradition attributes the arms to a banner given by Pope Benedict VIII to the Pisans in aid of the Sardinians in a conflict with the Saracens of Musetto who were trying to conquer the Italian peninsula and Sardinia. This flag, however, has inverted colours and no heads on it.

Before the Kingdom of Sardinia was founded, the rulers of the island were known as archons ( in Greek) or judges ( in Latin,  in Sardinian,  in Italian). The island was organized into one  from the 9th century on (see List of monarchs of Sardinia). After the Muslim conquest of Sicily in the 9th century, the Byzantines, who previously ruled Sardinia, couldn't manage to defend their far west province. Probably, a local noble family acceded to power, still identifying themselves as vassal of the Byzantines, but independent "de facto", as communications with Constantinople were very difficult. At the beginnings of the 11th century, an attempt to conquer the island was made by Spanish Muslims. We have very little record of that war, only by Pisa and Genoa chronicles. Christians won, but after that, the previous Sardinian kingdom was totally undermined and divided into four more little judicati: Cagliari, Arborea, Gallura, and Torres or Logudoro; each one developed its own coat of arms. When, with the appointment of the King of Aragon as King of Sardinia, the island again became one united kingdom, only the Judicatus of Arborea survived, and fought for a century against the Kingdom of Sardinia for supremacy.

According to some, the flag derives from Alcoraz victory of 1096, is linked to the Crown of Aragon, and represents the Spanish Reconquista against the Moors who occupied most of the Iberian Peninsula. It is composed of the cross of St. George, also a symbol of the Crusaders fighting in the same time in the Holy Land, and the four severed heads, representing four major victories in Spain by the Aragonese: the reconquest of Zaragoza, Valencia, Murcia, and the Balearic Islands. According to others (Mario Valdes y Cocom), the Moors represent the Egyptian Saint Maurice, martyred under Diocletian, and are shown in this manner, with the heads bandaged, in countless coats of arms in the Franco-German area. Even Saint Victor of Marseilles, who was from the same Theban Legion commanded by Maurice and escaped the decimation, is represented by a blackamoor with a bandage on his forehead, as in the High Altar of St. Nicholas' Church of Tallinn, now in the Art Museum of Estonia, Tallinn. The common tradition which links the stories of the two saints suggests that the symbol was designed between the St. Maurice Abbey Canton of Valais (Switzerland) and the Abbey of St. Victor in Marseilles; each was built in the place of martyrdom of the respective saint. Between 1112 and 1166 the County of Provence was under the direct control of the kings of Aragon, and until 1245 ruled by descendants of the same dynasty. The abbey of St. Victor of Marseilles had extensive property and political influence in Sardinia, especially in the Judicatus (kingdom) of Cagliari, from the 11th to the 13th century. There are hagiographies of many "Saint Victors" related to the Theban Legion, such as Viktor of Xanten or Victor of Solothurn and to the persecutions of Diocletian and Maximinus II as Victor Maurus of Milan, Victor of Puigcerdà, Spain, probably inspired by the same martyr.

The four Moors became the symbol of the Kingdom of Sardinia at its foundation, with the Corsican flag dating back to the same era, and became in time the flag of the island and its people. In any case, the meaning of the symbols, either two holy warriors or Moor heads cut off, makes it an emblem of warring Christianity, crusader in the broad sense of the term, originated in a historical period of bitter conflict between Islam and Christianity, in which Sardinia was fully involved.

Modern use

The symbol was adopted as the regional coat of arms already in 1950, with decree of the President of the Republic.
The flag, instead, became official only in 1999, by means of Regional Law n. 10.

Chronological gallery

Crown of Aragon

The four moors already represent the Kingdom of Sardinia but no trace is found in the island.

Imperial ideology of Charles V, Habsburg House, A little kingdom within an enormous empire

The four moors appear more frequently in prints, paintings, artifacts both in Sardinia and in all publications heraldic vintage.

Habsburg House (Spanish branch)

Out of the island the artists run wild

Savoy House

As the title of King of Sardinia was the only one who gave the ruling dynasty the coveted title, the coat of arms is enhanced and developed and overlaid with emblems of the other states ruled by the Savoy House

See also

 Flag of Corsica
 Maure

References

Sources
Giovanni Battista Fara, De Rebus Sardois, Cagliari, 1580
Geronimo Zurita, Anales de la Corona de Aragon, Zaragoza, 1610
Ferran De Sagarra, Sigillografia Catalana, inventari, descripciò i estudi dels segells de Catalunya, Barcelona, 1915
Martì De Riquer, Heràldica catalana des de l'Any 1150 al 1550, Barcelona, 1983
Salvatorangelo Palmerio Spanu, Origine dell'Arme di Sardegna, ESHA
Barbara Fois, Lo stemma dei quattro mori: breve storia dell'emblema dei sardi, Sassari, Carlo Delfino Editore, 1990
Franciscu Sedda, La vera storia della bandiera dei sardi, Cagliari, Edizioni Condaghes, 2007
Mauro Podda, Quattro mori a Bruxelles, L'Unione Sarda, 12 aprile 2008, Cagliari

External links

Black people in art
Sardinia
Kingdom of Sardinia
Sardinia
Sardinian culture
Sardinia
Sardinia